The Province of Santa Elena is a province of Ecuador in the coastal region. Created in 2007 from territory that belonged to the Guayas Province, it is one of the two newest provinces of Ecuador, along with Santo Domingo de Los Tsáchilas. Its capital city is Santa Elena, from which the province derives its name.

Political division 
The province is divided into three cantons. The following table lists each with its population at the 2001 census, its area in square kilometres (km2), and the name of the canton seat or capital.

Demographics 
Ethnic groups as of the Ecuadorian census of 2010:
Indigenous People  79.1%
Afro-Ecuadorian  10.8%
Montubio  4.9%
Other  2.4%

See also 
 Provinces of Ecuador
 Cantons of Ecuador

References 

 
Provinces of Ecuador
States and territories established in 2007